Jeffrey Scott Ballard (born August 13, 1963) is an American former professional baseball pitcher.

Playing career
Ballard played college baseball for Stanford University, and in 1984 played collegiate summer baseball with the Orleans Cardinals of the Cape Cod Baseball League. He earned a degree in geophysics from Stanford, and in 1998 was inducted into the Stanford Athletic Hall of Fame as one of Stanford's top pitchers, holding the all-time record in wins, strikeouts, and innings pitched for more than 20 years, as well as earning First Team All-Pac-10 twice.

In 1989, he finished in a tie with Dennis Eckersley and Gregg Olson for sixth place in American League Cy Young Award voting. In 1995, Ballard's car collided with a semi truck on a highway in Idaho, breaking his neck and several ribs. The accident ended his career. 

In 2004, Baltimore Orioles fans voted Ballard one of their 50 best loved Orioles.

Personal life
Following his career, Ballard returned to his hometown of Billings, Montana. In January 1996, he began working for his father and with his brother at Ballard Petroleum Holdings.

Ballard married the former Kristen Callison in 2008. Together, they had a son, Kyren, and a daughter, Kennley, as of 2014.

Filmography

Television

References

External links

1963 births
Living people
Baseball players from Montana
Hagerstown Suns players
Baltimore Orioles players
Pittsburgh Pirates players
Major League Baseball pitchers
Sportspeople from Billings, Montana
Stanford Cardinal baseball players
Stanford University School of Earth, Energy & Environmental Sciences alumni
Orleans Firebirds players
Pan American Games medalists in baseball
Pan American Games bronze medalists for the United States
Baseball players at the 1983 Pan American Games
Medalists at the 1983 Pan American Games
Buffalo Bisons (minor league) players
Charlotte O's players
Louisville Redbirds players
Newark Orioles players
Rochester Red Wings players